Donaldo "Dondon" Cabañes Hontiveros (born June 1, 1977) is a Filipino politician and former professional basketball player. He is a member of the Cebu City Council since June 30, 2022 and previously from 2019 to 2021. He was the Vice Mayor of Cebu City from November 2021 to June 2022, by virtue of succession due to the death of Mayor Edgardo Labella. He is also an assistant coach for the Phoenix Super LPG Fuel Masters of the Philippine Basketball Association (PBA).

In basketball, Hontiveros has won three PBA championships and was a 13-time PBA All-Star. He started his career in his hometown of Cebu City, playing for the University of Cebu at the collegiate level and becoming professional with the Cebu Gems of the Metropolitan Basketball Association (MBA). In the 2000 PBA draft, he was a direct hire of Tanduay and was later traded to the San Miguel Beermen, where he won the 2005 and 2009 PBA Fiesta Conferences. In 2013, he won the PBA Commissioner's Cup with the Alaska Aces. He then retired after winning the ASEAN Basketball League (ABL) championship in 2018 with San Miguel Alab Pilipinas. He thereafter ventured into politics and coaching.

Early life, high school and collegiate career
Born in Cebu City, Hontiveros fancied basketball at a young age and tried to enter the sport at a competitive level in his first year of high school. But at that time, since he lacked the height, no one took notice of him. However, he had a growth spurt by the time he was in third year so he was taken into the high school basketball team of Don Bosco Technical College–Cebu.

His first year with the varsity team was spent mostly on the bench. By the time he became a high school senior, he was already part of the team's rotation. At this point, he was already as tall as the team's center. His jump to college basketball suffered a minor setback when he ended his senior high school year with an injury. To keep himself competitive, he played in the intramural games at University of San Jose–Recoletos.

He eventually played college basketball at the University of Cebu for three years.

Professional career

Metropolitan Basketball Association
Hontiveros joined the Metropolitan Basketball Association in its maiden season in 1998 playing for the Cebu Gems.  However, despite being a fan favorite among the Cebuano fans, his stint with the Gems was marred with chaos, as he requested to be released by the team because he wanted to finish his studies and the constant travelling to different provinces with the team prompted him to drop some of his subjects.

Philippine Basketball Association
The Cebu Gems management tried to trade Hontiveros to different MBA teams. But Hontiveros' desire to play for the PBA eventually materialized as the Gems strike an agreement with Tanduay Rhum Masters, who acquired Hontiveros in exchange for cash. But after Tanduay franchise was sold to the Lina Group in 2002, San Miguel (his favorite team) acquired him through a trade. Soon, he found himself a vital cog in the team's offensive rotation as he was quickly promoted as a starter for the team. He was a member of the two championships won by San Miguel in 2004-2005 Fiesta Conference and the 2009 Fiesta Conference.

In March 2011, he, along with Danny Seigle, Dorian Pena and Paul Artadi were shipped to Air21 for younger players Rabeh Al-Hussaini, Nonoy Baclao and Rey Guevarra. During his stint with the Express, he emerged as one of the key players  In 2011 draft-day, he was traded back to Petron (San Miguel) along with the No.3 pick which was used to draft Chris Lutz.

Before the end of August 2012, he was involved in a six-player, four-team trade that sent him to Alaska. He was a vital addition off-the-bench for the Aces, and was a member of the 2013 championship team.  He would often provide heroics when it mattered, as evidenced in the games he played during the 2014-15 Philippine Cup.  He was the game's best player once during the elimination round against NLEX, and would provide his usual heroics in the playoffs, once against Rain or Shine and another during the Game 6 (a potential elimination game) against San Miguel in the Finals.

On January 16, 2015, he surpassed fellow Cebuano gunner Al Solis for the No. 4 all time in three-point field goals with 1,002.

ASEAN Basketball League
After finishing his contract with Alaska, Hontiveros was signed by ASEAN Basketball League (ABL) team Alab Pilipinas. It was after this stint that he retired from the game.

PBA career statistics

Season-by-season averages
 
|-
| align=left | 
| align=left | Tanduay
| 44 ||	25.9 || .389 || .273 || .729 || 2.6 ||	1.6 ||	.5 ||	.2 ||	10.2
|-
| align=left | 
| align=left | Tanduay
| 38 ||	29.8 || .386 || .406 || .646 || 3.9 ||	1.9 ||	.6 ||	.4 ||	12.5
|-
| align=left | 
| align=left | San Miguel
| 13 ||	32.5 || .413 || .333 || .632 || 4.6 ||	2.5 ||	.5 ||	.5 ||	11.9
|-
| align=left | 
| align=left | San Miguel
| 50 ||	33.3 || .417 || .368 || .831 || 4.6 ||	2.1 ||	.8 ||	.7 ||	12.8
|-
| align=left | 
| align=left | San Miguel
| 77 ||	34.7 || .416 || .320 || .729 || 4.4 ||	2.5 ||	1.0 ||	.7 ||	12.6
|-
| align=left | 
| align=left | San Miguel
| 42 ||	32.1 || .382 || .359 || .754 || 4.1 ||	2.1 ||	.9 ||	.5 ||	10.6
|-
| align=left | 
| align=left | San Miguel
| 31 ||	30.5 || .346 || .310 || .739 || 4.8 ||	3.7 ||	.7 ||	.3 ||	12.8
|-
| align=left | 
| align=left | Magnolia
| 44 ||	28.9 	 || .415 || .314 || .778 || 4.0 ||	2.7 ||	1.3 ||	.6 ||	11.7
|-
| align=left | 
| align=left | San Miguel
| 57 ||	29.8 || .437 || .379 || .812 || 4.5 ||	2.3 ||	.9 ||	.5 ||	14.8
|-
| align=left | 
| align=left | San Miguel
| 56 ||	28.4 || .443 || .376 || .710 || 3.4 ||	1.8 ||	.6 ||	.3 ||	11.8
|-
| align=left | 
| align=left | San Miguel / Air21 Express
| 49 ||	32.3 || .418 || .377 || .739 || 4.0 ||	2.0 ||	.9 ||	.4 ||	13.5
|-
| align=left | 
| align=left | Petron 
| 9 ||	12.8 || .243 || .250 || .375 || 2.0 ||	.6 ||	.1 ||	.0 ||	2.9
|-
| align=left | 
| align=left | Alaska
| 55 ||	22.2 || .319 || .294 || .811 || 2.9 ||	1.6 ||	.4 ||	.3 ||	6.2
|-
| align=left | 
| align=left | Alaska
| 44 ||	21.8 || .342 || .358 || .596 || 3.0 ||	1.1 ||	.5 ||	.1 ||	6.2
|-
| align=left | 
| align=left | Alaska
| 57 ||	21.3 || .359 || .343 || .758 || 2.5 ||	1.2 ||	.5 ||	.2 ||	7.6
|-
| align=left | 
| align=left | Alaska
| 57 ||	15.2 || .376 || .338 || .837 || 1.5 ||	.9 ||	.4 ||	.1 ||	5.7
|-
| align=left | 
| align=left | Alaska
| 24 ||	11.9 || .284 || .299 || .500 || 1.5 ||	.7 ||	.2 ||	.0 || 3.2
|-class=sortbottom
| align=center colspan=2 | Career
| 744 || 26.1 || .378 || .336 || .704 || 3.4 ||	1.8 ||	.6 ||	.3 || 9.8

National team career
Hontiveros played for the Philippine national team in 2002 and 2007. He also donned the national colors for the Smart-Gilas Team Pilipinas in 2011 and helped Gilas Pilipinas defeat Japan in the semifinals of the 2015 FIBA Asia Championship in China.

Political career
In the 2019 elections, Hontiveros won a seat in the Cebu City Council. Running under Barug PDP-Laban, he garnered the most votes in the 2nd district. He then became chairman of the council's Committee on Scholarship Program and Committee on Games and Amusement, and vice-chairman of the Committee on Youth and Sports Development. He sponsored the resolution that amended the city's scholarship program to include high school dropouts pursuing vocational education.

In September 2021, Hontiveros and colleague Phillip Zafra announced that they will seek reelection in 2022 as independent candidates; Barug PDP-Laban still endorses them as guest candidates. On October 31, the two councilors announced that they had changed their minds and would not leave Barug. However, the Commission on Elections still categorizes them as independents since they filed their certificates of candidacy (COC) as independents.

On November 20, 2021, Hontiveros, as the first councilor of the Cebu City Council, succeeded to the vice mayorship of Cebu City, replacing Mike Rama, who ascended as mayor of Cebu City after the death of Edgardo Labella. In 2022, Hontiveros returned to the council after topping the polls again.

Personal life
Hontiveros is a evangelical, and has a son named Isaiah with singer and fellow Cebu native Gail Blanco. He speaks three languages - his native Cebuano, English and Tagalog. He is also a cousin to Philippine Senator Risa and CNN Philippines anchor Pia Hontiveros.

He has also worn the following numbers during his career: the numbers 7 with Cebu Gems and San Miguel, the number 34 which was his first jersey number with Tanduay, and 24 with Air21, and 25 with Alaska Aces.

References

1977 births
Living people
Alaska Aces (PBA) players
Barako Bull Energy players
Basketball players at the 2002 Asian Games
Basketball players from Cebu
Cebu City Council members
Cebuano people
Filipino sportsperson-politicians
Philippine Basketball Association All-Stars
Philippine Basketball Association broadcasters
Philippines men's national basketball team players
Filipino men's basketball players
San Miguel Beermen players
Shooting guards
Small forwards
Sportspeople from Cebu City
San Miguel Alab Pilipinas players
Tanduay Rhum Masters players
Asian Games competitors for the Philippines
UC Webmasters basketball players
Filipino men's basketball coaches
Phoenix Super LPG Fuel Masters coaches
Vice Mayors of Cebu City